2011 Giravanz Kitakyushu season.

Squad

J2 League

References

External links
 J.League official site

Giravanz Kitakyushu
Giravanz Kitakyushu seasons